Benjamin Guy Whitehead (born 28 April 1997) is an English cricketer. He made his Twenty20 debut for Durham in the 2018 t20 Blast on 3 August 2018.

References

External links
 

1997 births
Living people
English cricketers
Durham cricketers
Place of birth missing (living people)
Northumberland cricketers